Big Brother Danmark was the Danish version of the international reality television franchise Big Brother created by producer John de Mol.  The series debuted on Danish television in January 2001 and was axed in June 2014, due to poor ratings.

The show first aired two regular seasons on TvDanmark2 (Now Kanal 4) in 2001. The series returned once again in 2003 on TvDanmark2, first with a celebrity season called "V.I.P.", later that year TvDanmark2 aired the first regular Big Brother season in nearly two years. In 2004 TvDanmark2 aired one season before the show was paused indefinitely. The season was a celebrity season and was called "Reality Allstars".

In 2007, it was announced that Modern Times Group, had bought the rights to Big Brother in Denmark. In the fall of 2007, TV3 Denmark aired the first season of Big Brother. The premiere of the 2007 series was watched by over 199,000 people in Denmark. Big Brother returned once again in 2008 under the title Hotel Big Brother, this season was a special season and it was broadcast in the summer of 2008. The special edition season only lasted for 56 days. In the fall of 2008, TV3 Denmark aired their third Big Brother season, that season was an ordinary season lasting 105 days.

In April 2009 Modern Times Group and TV3 Denmark announced that a new season of Big Brother would premiere in September 2009. In January 2010 Modern Times Group officially axed Big Brother Denmark after four seasons. They stated in a press release that they would for the future focus more on other productions such as Paradise Hotel and Robinson Ekspeditionen

In 2009, Kanal 4 chose to rebroadcast the first season of Big Brother Denmark.

After a 2-year break, Kanal 5 Denmark and SBS TV Denmark relaunched Big Brother Danmark in 2012 and the show aired for three regular seasons (2012–2014) and one special season (2012).

The show was finally cancelled after 13 years by SBS Discovery on June 19, 2014, due to poor ratings.

In 2021, on the 20th anniversary of the first season in Denmark, Jill Liv Nielsen who won the first season back in 2001 was interviewed by the Danish public service broadcaster DR, for an article about the show.

Series overview

Viewership

Ratings for the seasons of Big Brother Denmark

Cancellation 
SBS Discovery Media announced on 19 July 2014 that they had axed Big Brother Denmark, due to declining viewerships . Season 13 (2014) had an average viewership of 70.000. which is a drop since the first season of Big Brother Denmark back in 2001, which had an average of 500.000 viewers. Eight years after the cancellation (2022) are there still no plans of reviving the show in Denmark. It is therefore unknown when Big Brother will return to Denmark again.

Big Brother 2001 (season 1)
Start Date: 28 January 2001
End Date: 10 May 2001

Duration: 103 days

The Finalists: 2 - Jill* (The Winner) & Nico* (Runner-up)

The Grand Prize: 500,000 DKK

Evicted Housemates: 8 - Anja, Anna, Chris, Eddie, Eva, John, Naja* & Suzanne*

Voluntary Exits: 3(7*) - Christian, Pil & Søren

Ejected Housemates: 0 -

Notes: * - Jill, Naja, Nico & Suzanne voluntarily left the House and later re-entered

On day 77, all the remaining housemates left the house. Two hours later only four returned with agreement to get weekly visits by families and friends.

Nominations Table
The first person a housemate nominates is for 2 points, whilst the second nomination is for just 1 point.

Notes:
 John was exempt from the Nomination Process as he entered late on Day 4.
 As a new Housemate, Eddie was exempt from the Nomination Process this Week.
 On Day 58, the Housemates had to evict one of the new Housemates, either Anna or Naja.
 After winning a task Naja won the right to distribute 5 points, instead of the usual 3, this Week. She could do this any way she liked, and chose to give one point each to Eddie, Jill, Nico, Søren and Suzanne.
 All Housemates voluntarily left the House on Day 77 and only Jill, Naja, Nico and Suzanne angrred to re-enter the House following talks with the producers on Day 78. The Nominations are voided and the Eviction is cancelled as only 4 Housemates now remain in the House: Jill, Naja, Nico & Suzanne. 
 From now on all Housemates automatically face the Public Vote to evict, except for the final two who will face a vote to win.

Big Brother 2001 (season 2)
Start Date: 25 August 2001
End Date: 6 December 2001

Duration: 104 days

The Prize: 1,000,000 DKK

The Finalists: 3 - Carsten (The Winner), Sverre (Runner-up) & Sheila (3rd)

Evicted Housemates: 9 - Aida, Dina, Ghazal, June, Martin, Randi, René, Søren & Tina

Voluntary Exits: 2 - Cosmo & Mik

Nominations Table
The first person a housemate nominates is for 2 points, whilst the second nomination is for just 1 point.

Notes:
 The Housemates had to evict a male and a female. Each female voted to evict a male and each male voted to evict a female. The males are denoted by the blue boxes by their name, and the girls by the red boxes.
 On Day 34 Aida re-entered the House after a Public Vote, and was joined by Martin, a new Housemate.
 Martin was allowed to Nominate for 5 Points this Week, and distributed them as follows: Aida (3 points) and Cosmo (2 points).
 This Week the Public Nominated, and Aida and Martin received the most votes, and the surviving Housemates voted to Evict one of them. Ghazal, as a new Housemate, was Exempt from this Vote, but could vote and voted to Evict Martin.
 Randi was originally Nominated, but won immunity and hence Ghazal took her place. Martin was Evicted with just 71 more votes than Ghazal - the closest vote in Big Brother history.
 All Housemates faced the Public Vote to Evict this Week to decide the three finalists.
 The final three Housemates all faced the Public Vote to win.

Big Brother V.I.P. (season 3)
Start Date: 16 February 2003
End Date: 22 May 2003
Duration: 95 days
The Prize: 500,000 DKK
No live coverage: Shown weekly over 12 weeks, starting 7 March. The final was shown on 22 May 2003.
House: The Big Brother Norway house was used
The Finalists: 3 - Thomas (The Winner)-51%, Pil (Runner-up)-27% & Michael (3rd)-22%
Evicted Housemates: 9 - Bashy, Brigitte, Carl-Mar, Gigi, Helena, Kira, Lise-Lotte, Masja & Morten
Ejected Housemates: 1 - Moses

Housemates

Big Brother 2003 (season 4)
Start Date: 21 September 2003
End Date: 27 November 2003
Duration: 68 days
The Grand Prize: 1,000,000 DKK
The Finalists: 4 - Johnni (The Winner), Tania (Runner-up), Henrik (3rd) & Raz (4th)
Evicted Houseamtes: 7 - Cutter, Jesper, June, Kathrine, Makiah, Robert & Sissal
Voluntary Exits: 4 - Clara, Gry, Lotte & Martin
Ejected Housemates: 1 - Michael

Nominations Table
The first person a housemate nominates is for 2 points, whilst the second nomination is for just 1 point.

Note
 Kathrine, as a new Housemates, is Exempt from Nomination this Week; she can Nominate but not be Nominated. Robert automatically faces the Public Vote this Week for rule-breaking. The Eviction was Cancelled after a spate of recent Walk-outs and Ejections.
 Henrik and June are Exempt from the Nominations Process as new Housemates.
 Jesper, as a New Housemates, is Exempt from the Nomination Process.
 Robert was immune from Nomination this Week after winning a challenge.
 Robert was awarded an extra Nomination Point this Week for blocking cameras.

Big Brother – Reality Allstars 2004 (season 5)
Start Date: 1 March 2004
End Date: 1 April 2004
Duration: 31 days
The Winner: Jill Liv Nielsen
The Grand Prize: 250,000 DKK

Nominations Table
The first person a housemate nominates is for 2 points, whilst the second nomination is for just 1 point.

Big Brother 2012 (season 10) 
Start Date: 30 January 2012
End Date: 13 May 2012
Duration: 105 days
The Winner: Amanda Heisel
The Grand Prize: 500,000 DKK

Nominations table

Big Brother –4 Stjerners Middag 2012 (season 11) 
Start Date: 21 May 2012
End Date: 24 May 2012
Duration: 4 days
The Winner: Cathrine Pedersen
The Grand Prize: none

Big Brother 2013 (season 12) 
Start Date: 4 February 2013
End Date: 18 May 2013
Duration: 104 days
The Winner: Bjørn Clausen
The Grand Prize: 500,000 DKK

Nominations table

Big Brother 2014 (season 13) 
Start Date: 1 January 2014
End Date: 27 April 2014
Duration: 119 days
The Winner: David G. Feldstedt
The Grand Prize: 500,000 DKK

Nominations table

References

 
Danish reality television series
2010s Danish television series
2000s Danish television series
2001 Danish television series debuts
2006 Danish television series endings
Television series revived after cancellation
2012 Danish television series debuts
2014 Danish television series endings
Danish-language television shows
Kanal 4 original programming